Revelations: The Black EP is the third EP by American group William Control.  It is the second in a series of four EPs that make up the fifth studio album, Revelations, the other three being The Pale, The Red and The White, after the Four Horsemen of the Apocalypse.  It was released by Control Records on February 17, 2017 and peaked at number six on the Billboard Dance/Electronic Albums chart and number one on the Heatseekers chart.

The first single was Analog Flesh In A Digital World, released on February 10, 2017.  It was accompanied by a music video shot and directed by Jacob Johnston in Los Angeles in January 2017.  Johnston also directed the Knife Play video, released on April 1.  
All I Need was once again filmed in LA, at a later date, by Stephanie Carrasco and Spenser Leeds, and released on May 13.

The EP was recorded at Control's Hell's Half Acre studio and was produced and engineered by Kenneth Fletcher, and engineered and mixed by Axel Otero of the band Lay Your Ghost. It was mastered by John Troxell. Fans were invited down to the Control Merch shop to record gang vocals.

Track listing

Charts

Personnel
All credits adapted from liner notes.

 Kenneth Fletcher – producer, engineer, artwork, layout
 Axel Otero – engineer, mixing
 John Troxell – mastering

References

2017 EPs
Control Records albums
Synth-pop EPs
Dark wave EPs
William Control albums